Esporte Clube Milan, commonly known as Milan, is a Brazilian football club based in Júlio de Castilhos, Rio Grande do Sul state.

History
The club was founded on March 7, 1989, after Esporte Clube Castilhense and Sociedade Esportiva Cometa merged. They competed in the Campeonato Gaúcho Second Level for the first time in 1995 competing again in 1996.

Stadium
Esporte Clube Milan play their home games at Estádio Miguel Wairich Filho. The stadium has a maximum capacity of 1,000 people.

References

Association football clubs established in 1989
Football clubs in Rio Grande do Sul
1989 establishments in Brazil